Something Real is Meg & Dia's second album which was released on August 8, 2006.  After signing a deal with Doghouse Records the previous fall, they started recording in January 2006.  This album contains both brand new songs, and revamped versions of their originally acoustic songs. Many songs draw inspiration from books such as East of Eden, Rebecca and Indiana. "Courage, Robert" was written about composer Robert Schumann. The album peaked at #12 on the Billboard Heatseekers Chart.

Track listing
All songs are lyrics Meg and Dia Frampton, music Meg Frampton, except where noted:
 "Monster" – 2:43
 "Roses" – 3:28
 "Tell Mary" – 3:47
 "Indiana" – 2:47
 "Masterpiece" – 3:29 (lyrics and music Meg Frampton)
 "Rebecca" – 3:24 (lyrics and music Meg Frampton)
 "Nineteen Stars" – 3:26
 "Cardigan Weather" – 2:55
 "Getaways Turned Holidays" – 4:03 (lyrics and music Meg Frampton)
 "Courage, Robert" – 2:55
 "Setting Up Sunday" – 4:04
 "Monster (Acoustic iTunes Bonus Track)" – 2:42

References 

2006 albums
Meg & Dia albums
Doghouse Records albums